Biriyya  was a Palestinian Arab village in the Safad Subdistrict. It was depopulated during the 1947–1948 Civil War in Mandatory Palestine on May 2, 1948, by The Palmach's First Battalion of Operation Yiftach. Today the Israeli moshav of Birya includes the village site.

History
The village was on a hill 1.5 kilometres northeast of Safad. It is believed to have been built on the site of the Roman village of Beral or Bin, which was later also a Jewish town. Ishtori Haparchi, however, thought the village to have been the Beri of rabbinic literature.

Ottoman era
In the 1596 tax record, Biriyya was a village in the nahiya of Jira (liwa’ of Safad) with a Muslim population of 38 families and 3 bachelors, and a Jewish population of 16 families and 1 bachelor; a total  estimated population of 319 persons. The villagers paid taxes on crops such as wheat, barley, and olives and other types of produce and owned beehives, vineyards, and a press that was used for processing olives. Total taxes paid was  3,145 akçe.

A map from Napoleon's invasion of 1799 by Pierre Jacotin  showed the place, named as "Beria", while in 1838 Biria was noted as a village in the Safad region.

In 1875 Victor Guérin found Biriyya to have about 150 Muslim inhabitants.
In 1881, the PEF's Survey of Western Palestine (SWP) described  Biriyya  as having "good stone houses, containing about 100 Muslims, surrounded by arable cultivation, and several good springs near the village."

A population list from about 1887 showed  Biria to have  about 355 Muslim  inhabitants.

British Mandate era
In the 1922 census of Palestine conducted by the British Mandate authorities, Biria  had a population of 128, all Muslims,  increasing in the 1931 census to 170, still all  Muslims,  in  a total of 38  houses.

In the  1945 statistics it had a population of 240 Muslims with a total of 5,579 dunums of land. A total of 328 dunums were used for cereals,  53 dunums for irrigation for use in the orchards, while 25 dunums were built-up (urban) land.

The villagers sold their products at the market in nearby Safad.

1948 war and aftermath

On April 7, 1948, it was reported that 20 Arabs had been killed near Mount Canaan, outside Safad. On May 1, 1948, the Palmach's First Battalion captured Biriyya. The occupation of Safad and eastern Galilee was completed in May 1948 during Operation Yiftach.

In 1992 the village site was described: "About fifteen houses remain and are inhabited by the residents of the settlement of Biriyya, the settlement has been expanded to include the village site. In addition to the inhabited houses, four are semi-deserted or used for storage. Stones from destroyed houses can be found in some of the walls around the settlement. Many old almond, olive, fig, and eucalyptus trees are scattered throughout the site, mingled with trees that have been planted more recently."

See also
 Depopulated Palestinian locations in Israel
 Birya affair

References

Bibliography

External links
 Welcome To Biriyya
 Biriyya,  Zochrot
Survey of Western Palestine, Map 4:   IAA, Wikimedia commons 
 Biriyya, from the Khalil Sakakini Cultural Center
 Biriyya, Dr. Khalil Rizk.

Arab villages depopulated during the 1948 Arab–Israeli War
District of Safad